The Wine and Spirit Trade Association (WSTA) is a British trade association for the wine and spirits industry, representing over 300 companies producing, importing and selling wines and spirits in the United Kingdom. WSTA members range from major retailers, brand owners and wholesalers to fine wine and spirit specialists, logistics and bottling companies.

References

External links
 Wine and Spirit Trade Association Official website.

Business organisations based in the United Kingdom
Wine industry organizations
1824 establishments in the United Kingdom
Organizations established in 1824
British wine